Manolas is the main settlement and the capital of Therasia, the small island opposite to Santorini (Thera). It is located in the east of island, above the abrupt Santorini caldera. It has a beautiful view of the volcano and the main settlements of Santorini such as Fira, Imerovigli, Oia, etc. Manolas can be approached either by road from the port of Riva or the uphill path from the small port of Korfos. Donkeys are the main mode of transport on this path. Manolas has a population of 160 inhabitants according to the 2011 census. It belongs to Thira municipality and Oia municipal unit.

Historical population

Places of interest
Manolas is a traditional Cycladic village with small, cubic houses, white walls and narrow streets. The settlement is located at the top of the island and it has a clear view of the caldera. A notable building in the region is the Church of Saint Constantine, built in 1874. A route around the village is the stone uphill path that joins Manolas with the small port of Corfu. Near the village is the uninhabited settlement Kera and the traditional Cycladic monastery of Panagia Trypiti or Kera, which is located 3 km south of Manolas.

References

External links
Περιήγηση santorini.gr 

Therasia
Populated places in Thira (regional unit)